The Julian C. Smith Hall is a historic building located on Julian C. Smith Drive, on Hadnot Point in Marine Corps Base Camp Lejeune, Jacksonville, North Carolina.  It currently serves as the headquarters building for the II Marine Expeditionary Force and the 2d Marine Division.  It is named after Lieutenant General Julian C. Smith, former commanding general of the 2d Marine Division during World War II.  The Camp Lejeune address is Building H-1.

History
The building was initially used as a Naval hospital.

Footnotes

Jacksonville, North Carolina
Military installations in North Carolina
United States Marine Corps installations
Buildings and structures in Onslow County, North Carolina